The Kurrama River, or Kurram River, originates from watershed of Spin Ghar in the Paktia Province of Afghanistan and the Kurram District of Pakistan, flows through North Waziristan and Khyber Pakhtunkhwa, passing through the city of Bannu, and then joins the Indus River near Isa Khel. It drains the southern flanks of the Spin Ghar mountain range and is a right bank tributary of the Indus River.

Its tributaries include the Kirman River and the Khurmana River.

The nearby Kurran-Garhi Project, finished in 1962, provides flood control and is used for irrigation and power.  The soil around Kurrama river is very suitable for agriculture; It contains living properties and is subject to flood at some seasons.

Topography 
Topography of the catchment area of Kurrama River is, generally, mountainous in upper reaches near Ali Khayl, Mirazi Kalay, Peer Kalai, Kharlachi, Parachinar and Thal areas. Near Bannu city, the river flattens up and follows consistent mild slope up to its outfall in to the Indus River near Isa Khel. The elevations ranging from about 4750 m to 200 m and sloping northwest–southeast. Most of the flat terraces available along the river are utilized for agriculture for which water from the river is utilised. Moreover, there exist number of irrigation canals and civil channels on overtaking from the river.

See also 
 Kurram Valley
 Bannu District 
 Ghoriwala
 Isakhel

References

Rivers of Khyber Pakhtunkhwa
Landforms of Paktia Province
Landforms of Khost Province
Rivers of Pakistan